The 1905 Rutgers Queensmen football team represented Rutgers University as an independent during the 1905 college football season. In their second, non-consecutive season under head coach Oliver D. Mann, the Queensmen compiled a 3–6 record and were outscored by their opponents, 99 to 44. The team captain was Harold F. Green.

Schedule

References

Rutgers
Rutgers Scarlet Knights football seasons
Rutgers Queensmen football